Ganga Maiya is a holy place situated in Jhalmala, a place near Balod in Durg District. During the Hindu festival of Navratri, this place is very crowded. Many worshipers of Maa Durga come here to every year to celebrate the Navratri. Navratri is celebrated twice a year i.e. in the Hindu month of Chaitra and Kunwar. During these nine days devotes keep fasting and thousands of people visit this place barefoot and they come by walking from long distance.

The Hindu temple of Ganga Maiya was converted into the Catholic church, dedicated to Saint Andrew, an apostle, but the structure of the ancient Hindu temple was maintained.

See also
 List of Hindu temples in India

External links
 "Ganga Maiya  Temple JHALMALA"

Hindu temples in Chhattisgarh
Balod district